The 1977 New Zealand bravery awards were announced in conjunction with the Queen's Silver Jubilee and Birthday Honours on 11 June  1977, and via a Special Honours List dated 22 December 1977, and recognised ten people for acts of bravery in 1976 and 1977.

Queen's Gallantry Medal (QGM)
 Kenneth Trevor Penniall – of Auckland.
 David Alexander Jethro Hadley – of Auckland.

Queen's Commendation for Brave Conduct
 Michael Thomas Lawson – of Waimauku.
 Kenneth Arnold Lovell – of Waimauku.
 Brian Baker – of Mairangi Bay.

 Ronald Edmund Sanders Lorton – prison officer, Waikeria Youth Centre.

 Constable Douglas Robert Smith – New Zealand Police; of Taupō

 Constable Miles Hearn Paignton – New Zealand Police; of Rotorua.

Queen's Commendation for Valuable Service in the Air
 Russell Godfrey Gutschlag – of Nelson; pilot, Helicopters (NZ) Ltd.
 John William Reid  – of Nelson; general manager, Helicopters (NZ) Ltd.

References

Bravery
Bravery awards
New Zealand bravery awards